Polytaenia texana, commonly known as Texas prairie parsley, is a species of flowering plant in the carrot family (Apiaceae). It is native to Texas and Oklahoma in the United States.

References

Apioideae
Flora of Oklahoma
Flora of Texas
Flora without expected TNC conservation status